Jedfoot railway station served the town of Jedburgh, Scottish Borders, Scotland from 1856 to 1948 on the Jedburgh Railway.

History 
The station opened as Jedfoot Bridge on 17 July 1856 by the Jedburgh Railway Company. To the northeast was a goods siding. The station's name was changed to Jedfoot in 1913. It closed on 13 August 1948. The platform still remains, albeit in an overgrown state.

References

External links 

Disused railway stations in the Scottish Borders
Former North British Railway stations
Railway stations in Great Britain opened in 1856
Railway stations in Great Britain closed in 1948
1856 establishments in Scotland
1948 disestablishments in Scotland